Onitsha ( or simply Ọ̀nị̀chà) is a city located on the eastern bank of the Niger River, in Anambra State, Nigeria. A metropolitan city, Onitsha is known for its river port and as an economic hub for commerce, industry, and education. It hosts the Onitsha Main Market, the largest market in Africa in terms of geographical size and volume of goods.

As of 2016, Onitsha had an estimated city proper population of 2,080,000 people.   As of early 2022, Onitsha has a rising  estimated population at 3,553,000.  The indigenous people of Onitsha are Igbos and speak the Igbo language. The Onitsha people are referred to as Ndi Onicha.

Founding and settlement 

Onitsha Mmili was originally known as Onitsha Ado na Idu. This Igbo town has lived there for years and eventually emigrated across the Niger River to establish the Onitsha community.

After their arrival on the east bank (Onicha-mmili, "Onitsha-on-water", see above), the community gradually became a unitary kingdom, evolving from a loosely organized group of "royal" villages to encompass "non-royal" villages.

Modern history 

Onitsha slowly grew to become an important trading port for the Royal Niger Company in the mid-1850s following the abolition of slavery and with the development of the steam engine when Europeans were able to move into the hinterland.

Trade in palm kernels, palm oil, and other cash crops on the coast of the Bight of Biafra increased around this river port in the 19th century.

In 1857 British palm oil traders established a permanent station in the city with Christian missionaries joining them, headed by the liberated African bishop Samuel Ajayi Crowther (a Yoruba recaptive) and Reverend John Taylor (an Igbo Recaptive).

In 1900 Onitsha became part of a British protectorate. The British colonial government and Christian missionaries penetrated most of Igboland to set up their administration, schools and churches through the river port at Onitsha.

In 1965, the Niger River Bridge was built across the Niger River to replace the ferry crossing. This has helped to grow trade routes with western Nigeria and created significant economic linkages between Onitsha and Benin City and Lagos particularly.

The Nigerian-Biafran war brought devastation to Onitsha as the city was a major theatre of war for forces entering Biafra from the western front. The subsequent oil boom years of the 1970s and early 1980s witnessed a huge influx of immigrants into the city. The result has been hastily constructed and haphazard building which has created a huge number of slums.

People and culture 

Onitsha traditionally consists of nine villages, otherwise known as Ebo Itenani. These are descendants of the progenitor Umuezechima comprising  Isiokwe, Olosi, Umuezearoli, Okebunabo, Obikporo and Ogbeotu, Awada (Ogbeozoma), Obamkpa comprising Umuasele, Iyiawu and Odoje Ndugbe and Odumegwu Gbuagu, Ubulu na Ikem, Ulutu, Ubene, Ogboli Eke, Obior and Ogbeotu.  Within these groupings, there are six administrative wards namely Okebunabo, Umuezearoli, Ogbeolu, Isiokwe na Ogboli Olosi, Obamkpa and Eke na Ubene.

Onitsha operates a traditional government headed by the Obi, the titular head of the town who is assisted by Ndi Ichie,  titled red cap elders or chiefs. Among these are Ndi Ichie Ume, who are the First Class Chiefs. The Ndi Ichie are classified into six, namely: Onowu Iyasele, Ajie Ukadiugwu, Odu Osodi, Onya Ozoma, Ogene Onira and Owelle Osowa, with Onowu Iyasele as the traditional Prime Minister. There are also other Ndi Ichie, who are ranked second class, known as Ndi Okwa and third class, known as Ndi Ichie Okwareze. The Ndi Ichie serve as Council of Advisers to the Obi who solicits their advice in major decisions he makes in the Kingdom.

When the ruling Obi joins his ancestors, the Onowu Iyasele takes charge until a new Obi is enthroned.

Once a year in October the kingdom of Onitsha holds the Ofala Festival which coincides with the traditional New Yam festival held in many parts of Igboland. It is a way for the people of Onitsha to keep their culture alive and it has become a major event that draws visitors from far and wide to the city.

Geography 

Onitsha lies at a major east–west crossing point of the Niger River and occupies the northernmost point of the river regularly navigable by large vessels. These factors have historically made Onitsha a major center for trade between the coastal regions and the north, as well as between eastern and western Nigeria. Onitsha possesses one of the very few road bridge crossings of the mile-wide Niger River and plans are in place to add a second bridge near it.

Rapid urbanization in recent years negatively affects natural vegetation and local landscape.

Urbanization 
In the early 1960s, before the Nigerian Civil War (see also Biafra), the population was officially recorded as 76,000, and the town was distinctive in a number of dimensions; the great Nigerian writer Chinua Achebe (born and raised in the contiguous town of Ogidi) characterized it as harboring an "esoteric region from which creativity sallies forth at will to manifest itself,"  "a zone of occult instability" (see "Onitsha Matters").

Indeed, Onitsha has played a creative role in the transformation to urban life in Eastern Nigeria famous as the setting for Onitsha Market Literature and as one of the hubs for the financing and distribution of Nollywood films.

However, infrastructure has not kept pace with urbanization and haphazard building practices without zoning regulations has left in its wake a chaotic and congested city rife with lawlessness. The World Health Organization Global Urban Ambient Air Pollution database's 2016 update indicates that Onitsha is the most polluted city in Africa.

In recent times with its expansion into neighboring communities, the Onitsha people have been involved in disputes over land ownership in the surrounding area with the people of Obosi and Nkwelle Ezunaka. Fegge, Woliwo, Odoakpu, Awada, and 3-3 are Onitsha metropolitan areas being disputed by the communities of Obosi and Nkwelle Ezunaka, respectively.

Economy 

In 2012 the state government, through a joint venture, attracted SAB Miller to invest in Onitsha Brewery, which started production in August. It was the first large-scale investment in Onitsha since Premier Breweries, makers of the Premier Beer established production in Onitsha in the early part of the 1980s. In January it was announced that upgrades to the value of $110 million would triple the output of beer and malt drinks.

International Airport Connections
Onitsha is not only accessible by rivers and land, but also by air. The city has an international cargo and passenger airport located at Umueri.

Religion and politics 
Onitsha is a predominantly Christian city. Islam is also practiced in the city by people from Northern and Western Nigeria. In February 2006, armed militants killed at least 24 ethnic Hausa Fulani (Muslims) and burned a few Muslim sites, including two mosques. The riots were in response to riots by Muslims in the city of Maiduguri days earlier, where at least 18 Christians were killed, sparked by the cartoon controversy in Denmark.

Environmental Issues

Waste Management

There is improper disposal of solid waste in the metropolis resulting in poor sanitary conditions. The amount of waste generation is attributed to the city's high population being a commercial area that draws in people from within and outside Nigeria for business purposes. They generate mostly food waste, polythene bags, paper and its related wastes and metal. Others are pieces of  clothes, plastic, tins, bottles  and  glass materials. Households dispose solid waste in unauthorized places such as the road, water and its channels, dump stands and near dumpsites. This waste disposal attitude is due to inadequate provision of
solid waste management facilities, poor accessibility to dumpsite, social, moral and economic factors. Awka, the capital of Anambra state generates more than 400 tons of solid waste daily, with only 30 percent collected. The volume varies for other commercial cities in the state such as Onitsha on a daily basis.

Air Pollution 
In 2016, PM10 levels exceeded the WHO's standard by 30 times.

Noise Pollution

The city's noise levels exceeds the federal ministry of environment stipulated limits of 90 dB (A) and that of NESREA's 70 dB (A) for an 8-hour working period, varying in dry season and wet seasons. High noise levels are experienced mainly around major junctions and market places such as Onitsha main market and new spare parts market. The market noise emanates from the use of grinding machines, public address systems, generators, bell ringing  and shouting  by traders. Whereas, that of the major junctions result from transportation activities and vehicular traffic around Iweka flyover, Belewa junction, old and new market road junction, old Nkisi road and Nkpor junction.

Climate 
Onitsha has two seasons, the wet season, which is warm, oppressive, and overcast, and the dry season that is hot, muggy, and partly cloudy. Over the length of the year, the temperature commonly varies from 67 °F to 88 °F and is commonly below 59 °F or above 92 °F.

Water Pollution 

The city's vast surface water, shallow subsurface water, and permeable soils put it at high risk of water pollution. This is compounded by the industry density in the area ranging from food/beverage, chemical, pharmaceutical, textile, wood, leather to automobile/miscellaneous assembly industries that generates different waste forms. The city's surface and sub-surface water is polluted by heavy metals such as arsenic, cadmium, lead, mercury, zinc, copper, and iron. This pollution originates mainly from effluent discharge from industries, refuse dump sites, fuel/diesel from filling stations and vehicle exhaust fumes and hospitals. The distribution of industries close to the location of River Niger and nwangene stream contributes to the pollution of these waterbodies.

Twin towns 
Onitsha is twinned with:
  Compton, California, United States (2010)
  Indianapolis, Indiana, United States (2017)

Notable people 
The Onitsha people were among the first Igbo to embrace western education, producing notable people like Bishop Alphonsus Chukwuma Onyeabo,  Order of the British Empire, 1879–1954, and the main contributor of the English to Igbo bible, Dr. Nnamdi Azikiwe, Owele of Onicha, Zik of Africa, and the first president of the post-independent Nigeria.
 Ben Enwonwu, painter and sculptor
 Louis Mbanefo, lawyer and justice
 Chike Obi, mathematician
 Ukpabi Asika, politician
 Emmanuel Ifeajuna, a former army major and high jumper - first Black African to win gold at a major international sports competition
 Olisa Agbakoba, lawyer and human rights activist.
 Henry Onyekuru, footballer
 Alex Iwobi, professional footballer, Everton forward.
 Nwagboka, wealthy trader.
 Tony Nwoye, Nigerian politician.
 Janet Okala, Nigerian political leader.
 Francisca Nneka Okeke, Nigerian physicist.
 Flora Azikiwe, first wife of Nnamdi Azikiwe, the first President of Nigeria.
 Ukpabi Asika, Nigerian academic and civil servant.
 Francis Obikwelu, retired Nigerian-born Portuguese sprinter.

See also 
 Onitsha Market Literature – literature sold at the main market in the 1950s and 60s
 Onitsha – a novel by French author J. M. G. Le Clézio
 Ryszard Kapuscinski writes of "The Hole of Onitsha" in his book The Shadow of the Sun.

Notes

References 

 The People and history of Onitsha

Further reading 
 

 
Populated places in Anambra State
Communities on the Niger River
Cities in Anambra State
States and territories established in 1550
Cities in Nigeria
1550 establishments in Africa
Towns in Igboland